Heardmont is an unincorporated community in Elbert County, in the U.S. state of Georgia.

History
A post office called Heardmont was established in 1871, and remained in operation until 1953. The community was named for Stephen Heard, an early Governor of Georgia, who lived at Heardmont.

References

Unincorporated communities in Elbert County, Georgia
Unincorporated communities in Georgia (U.S. state)